Dorcadion klavdiae is a species of beetle in the family Cerambycidae. It was described by Mikhail Leontievich Danilevsky in 1992.

References

klavdiae
Beetles described in 1992